The 1969 Georgia 500 was a NASCAR Grand National Series event that was held on November 17, 1968, at Middle Georgia Raceway in Byron, Georgia. It is not to be confused with another running of the 1969 Georgia 500 which actually took place in 1969.

The transition to purpose-built racecars began in the early 1960s and occurred gradually over that decade.  Changes made to the sport by the late 1960s brought an end to the "strictly stock" vehicles of the 1950s.

Race report
Thirty drivers qualified for this 500-lap racing event that took three hours and eight minutes to complete. Most of the field was driving vehicles made by Ford. J.D. McDuffie ended up becoming the last-place finisher due to a problem with his engine on lap 20. Ed Negre was the lowest finishing driver to complete the race regardless of being 206 laps behind the drivers on the lead lap. Six thousand excited NASCAR fans were eager to see Richard Petty defeat David Pearson by a margin of five seconds.

J.D. McDuffie's vehicle developed engine problems on lap 20. Jabe Thomas's vehicle developed similar issues on lap 26. An oil leak took Bill Champion out of the race on lap 81 while Don Tomberlin's engine stopped working normally on lap 90. The rear end of Don Tarr's vehicle became dangerously loose on lap 94. Driveshaft problems relegated Darel Dieringer to the sidelines on lap 119. E.J. Trivette managed to overheat his vehicle on lap 140. Ervin Pruitt no longer had a safe rear end for his vehicle on lap 162. Earl Brooks inflicted terminal damage on his vehicle on lap 189. G.C. Spencer lost the rear end of his vehicle on lap 210. Wayne Smith fell out with engine failure on lap 222.

Bobby Allison's vehicle no longer had a rear end on lap 252; forcing his exit from the race. Engine problems forced Bobby Isaac out of the race on lap 315 while a terminal crash took LeeRoy Yarbrough out of the race on lap 316. Friday Hassler's engine problems were unfortunate enough to kick him out of the race on lap 476 with a "fortunate" sixth-place finish.

From the halfway point (lap 251) to the end of the event, Petty and Pearson didn't allow the lead to escape their collective grasps. David Pearson, Bobby Isaac, and Bobby Allison all dominated the opening 100 laps of this racing event. Thankfully, this would be the final time that NASCAR followed the old tradition of starting the season in November.

Notable crew chiefs for the race were Harry Hyde, Dale Inman, Mario Rossi, Dick Hutcherson, and John Hill. Individual driver earnings from this racing event ranged from the winner's share of $3,500 ($ when considering inflation) to the lowest possible earnings of $150 ($ when considering inflation).

Organizers were authorized to hand over a grand total of $16,935 for all the qualifying drivers ($ when considering inflation).

Qualifying

Finishing order
Section reference: 

 Richard Petty (No. 43)
 David Pearson† (No. 17)
 James Hylton (No. 48)
 Elmo Langley† (No. 64)
 John Sears† (No. 4)
 Friday Hassler*† (No. 39)
 Neil Castles (No. 06)
 Bill Seifert (No. 47)
 Henley Gray (No. 19)
 Ben Arnold (No. 76)
 Cecil Gordon† (No. 45)
 Roy Mayne† (No. 46)
 Wendell Scott† (No. 34)
 Walson Gardner (No. 93)
 Roy Tyner† (No. 9)
 LeeRoy Yarbrough*† (No. 56)
 Bobby Isaac*† (No. 71)
 Ed Negre (No. 8)
 Bobby Allison* (No. 14)
 Wayne Smith* (No. 38)
 G.C. Spencer*† (No. 49)
 Earl Brooks*† (No. 5)
 Ervin Pruitt* (No. 57)
 E.J. Trivette* (No. 80)
 Darel Dieringer*† (No. 22)
 Don Tarr* (No. 0)
 Don Tomberlin* (No. 96)
 Bill Champion*† (No. 10)
 Jabe Thomas* (No. 25)
 J.D. McDuffie*† (No. 70)

† signifies that the driver is known to be deceased 
* Driver failed to finish race

Timeline
Section reference:

References

Georgia 500 (November 1968)
Georgia 500 (November 1968)
NASCAR races at Middle Georgia Raceway